The United Team of Germany was a combined team of athletes from West Germany and East Germany that competed in the 1956, 1960 and 1964 Winter and Summer Olympic Games. In 1956, the team also included athletes from a third Olympic body, the Saarland Olympic Committee, which had sent a separate team in 1952, but in 1956 was in the process of joining the German National Olympic Committee. This process was completed in February 1957 after the admission of Saarland into West Germany.

History 

As East Germany had introduced its own national anthem in 1949, Beethoven's Symphony No. 9 melody to Schiller's Ode an die Freude ("Ode to Joy") was played for winning German athletes as a compromise. In 1959, East Germany also introduced an altered black-red-gold tricolour flag of Germany as the flag of East Germany. Thus, a compromise had to be made also for the flag of the unified sports team. It was agreed upon to superimpose the plain flag with additional white Olympic rings. This flag was used from 1960 to 1968.

At the Games of 1956, 1960 and 1964 the team was simply known as "Germany" and the usual country code of GER was used, except at Innsbruck in 1964, when the Austrian hosts used the German language "D" for Deutschland.
Yet, the IOC code EUA (from the official French International Olympic Committee (IOC) designation Équipe Unifiée d'Allemagne) is currently applied retrospectively in the IOC medal database, without further explanation given. Only in 1976 did the IOC start to assign standardized codes. Before that time, the local Organizing Committees of each Olympic Games had chosen codes, often in the local language, resulting in a multitude of codes.

In the 1968 Winter Olympics, East and West German athletes competed as separate teams while still using the compromise Olympic flag and Beethoven anthem. While today listed under the IOC codes of FRG (West) and GDR (East), respectively, in 1968 they were asymmetrically called in French Allemagne (Germany) and Allemagne de l'Est (East Germany), and in Spanish Alemania and Alemania del Este. The codes for Germany (West) were ALL (in Grenoble) and ALE (in Mexico City), and ADE for East Germany.

The separation was completed at the 1972 Winter Olympics with the use of separate flags and anthems. Because of the boycotts of the 1980 and 1984 summer games, only in 1972, 1976 and 1988 did two different German teams with different symbols compete against each other at Summer Olympics (not counting the Saar team of 1952). East Germany ceased to exist in 1990, when its five states, together with Berlin, joined West Germany in German reunification.

Participation

Timeline of participation

Medal tables

Medals by Summer Games

Medals by Winter Games

Medals by summer sport

Medals by winter sport

See also
Germany at the Summer Olympics
Germany at the Winter Olympics
Unified Korean sporting teams
Unified Team (disambiguation)

References

External links
 
 
 

 
United Team
1956 establishments in Europe